Carlos Wilson Cachicote da Rocha (born 5 January 1989), commonly known as Rudy, is an Angolan professional footballer who plays as an attacking midfielder or a forward for Basildon.

Club career
Born in Oeiras, Lisbon District, Rudy played lower league football until the age of 22, his first stop being with Sporting Clube Linda-a-Velha in the Lisbon regional championships. In 2011, he signed with Cercle Brugge KSV, scoring 13 goals in 33 matches in his first season to help his team to the seventh position in the Belgian Pro League as well as the UEFA Europa League final playoff, lost to K.A.A. Gent; he found the net in only his second appearance, a 1–1 home draw against R.A.E.C. Mons.

Rudy joined Deportivo de La Coruña from Spain in summer 2013, as a free agent. He returned to Portugal a few months afterwards, being loaned to former youth club C.F. Os Belenenses and making his Primeira Liga debut on 8 February 2014 in a 0–2 away loss to C.D. Nacional (65 minutes played).

In August 2014, Rudy's Deportivo contract was cancelled by mutual consent and he moved to Greek side Skoda Xanthi FC. Late in the year, he returned to the land of his ancestors and joined C.R.D. Libolo.

After a year in the Cypriot First Division with Doxa Katokopias FC, Rudy joined C.F. União of Portugal's LigaPro on an 18-month deal on 5 January 2018. In July that year, he switched to Waterford F.C. in the League of Ireland Premier Division, on an undisclosed contract.

International career
Rudy's mother was Angolan, and his father hailed from São Tomé and Príncipe. He chose to represent the former national team internationally, and accepted a callup for a pair of games in May 2014.

In July 2014, Rudy was asked to switch his international allegiance to Angola. He made his international debut in a friendly with Ethiopia on 3 August, playing the final 30 minutes in a 1–0 win at the Estádio 11 de Novembro.

Personal life
His brothers Quevin Castro, Valter Rocha, and Aires are also footballers.

References

External links

1989 births
Living people
People from Oeiras, Portugal
Portuguese sportspeople of Angolan descent
Portuguese people of São Tomé and Príncipe descent
Angolan people of São Tomé and Príncipe descent
Portuguese twins
Twin sportspeople
Black Portuguese sportspeople
Portuguese footballers
Angolan footballers
Association football midfielders
Association football forwards
Primeira Liga players
Liga Portugal 2 players
Segunda Divisão players
S.C. Praiense players
Atlético Clube de Portugal players
C.F. Os Belenenses players
C.F. União players
Belgian Pro League players
Cercle Brugge K.S.V. players
Segunda División players
Deportivo de La Coruña players
Super League Greece players
Xanthi F.C. players
Girabola players
C.R.D. Libolo players
Cypriot First Division players
Doxa Katokopias FC players
League of Ireland players
Waterford F.C. players
G.D. Vitória de Sernache players
Basildon United F.C. players
Angola international footballers
Portuguese expatriate footballers
Angolan expatriate footballers
Expatriate footballers in Belgium
Expatriate footballers in Spain
Expatriate footballers in Greece
Expatriate footballers in Cyprus
Expatriate association footballers in the Republic of Ireland
Expatriate footballers in England
Portuguese expatriate sportspeople in Belgium
Portuguese expatriate sportspeople in Spain
Portuguese expatriate sportspeople in Greece
Portuguese expatriate sportspeople in Cyprus
Portuguese expatriate sportspeople in Ireland
Portuguese expatriate sportspeople in England
Angolan expatriate sportspeople in Belgium
Angolan expatriate sportspeople in Spain
Angolan expatriate sportspeople in Greece
Angolan expatriate sportspeople in Cyprus
Angolan expatriate sportspeople in England
Sportspeople from Lisbon District